Radomir Belaćević (31 December 1929 – 3 June 2005) was a Serbian film director, actor, producer and writer.

Biography
Belaćević was born on 31 December 1929 in the village of Junkovac, near the town of Lazarevac, Serbia. He owned a private film corporation called "Studio Film" and wrote several books. Belaćević directed television dramas such as Tatin sin, Sudija i advokat, Žandarm, Carina, Ženidba na švedski način and Majka šalje sina u armiju, and has also written some movie scripts based on his books.

He died on 3 June 2005.

Filmography
As producer:
Konobarica ("The Waitress") (1995)
Dečak iz Junkovca (A boy from Junkovac) (1995)
Tatin sin (Daddy's son)  (1999)

As director:
Tatin sin (Daddy's son)
Sudija i advokat (Judge and a lawyer)
Žandarm (A cop)
Carina (Custom)
Ženidba na Švedski način (Wedding in a Swedish way)
Маjka šalje sina u armiju (Mother sends her son to the army)

Film scripts
Belaćević wrote these film scripts, which are based on his novels:
Ne pušim više (I quit smoking)
Seks i droga (Sex and drugs)
Таjni klub (The secret club)
Hitler zamislio pobedu (Hitler imagined the victory)
Stranac u Parizu (A foreigner in Paris)
Kоnobarica (The waitress)
Dečak iz Junkovca (A boy from Junkovac)
Tatin sin (Daddy's son)

Bibliography
He has written many books, including:
Mnogi kradu  (Many steal)
Socijalizam i promašaji (Socialism and mistakes)
Stranac u Parizu (A foreigner in Paris)
Ukleto porodilište (Cursed maternity ward)
Konobarica ("The Waitress")
Privatni detektiv (Private detective)
Božija pravda (God's justice)

References

1929 births
2005 deaths
Serbian film directors
Serbian male actors
Serbian writers
Serbian film producers